Bojić is a South-Slavic language surname. It may be written without diacritics as Bojic or transcribed as Bojich.

Geographical distribution
As of 2014, 46.0% of all known bearers of the surname Bojić were residents of Serbia, 24.3% of Bosnia and Herzegovina, 9.7% of Croatia, 5.8% of Montenegro and 2.4% of Slovenia. In these countries, the frequency of the surname was as follows:
 1. Montenegro (1: 1,025)
 2. Serbia (1: 1,485)
 3. Bosnia and Herzegovina (1: 1,491)
 4. Croatia (1: 4,248)
 5. Slovenia (1: 8,125)

Notable people

Andrija Bojić (born 1993), Serbian basketball player
Bogdan Bojić (born 1999), Montenegrin basketball player
Dubravko Bojić (born 1953), Serbian politician+
Lazar Bojić (1791-1859), Serbian writer and priest
Luka Bojić (born 1992), Montenegrin footballer
Marko Bojić (born 1988), Montenegrin volleyball player
Milorad Bojic, Serbian scientist
Milovan Bojić (born 1955), Serbian politician
Milutin Bojić (1892-1917), Serbian poet and playwright
Nik Bojic (born 1992), Australian high jumper
Pedj Bojić (born 1984), Australian footballer
Petar Bojić (born 1991), Serbian footballer
Raško Bojić (born 1964), Serbian basketball coach
Slobodan Bojic (born 1992), Montenegrin volleyball player

References

Serbian surnames
Croatian surnames
Montenegrin surnames